Justin Herron (born November 27, 1995) is an American football offensive tackle for the Las Vegas Raiders of the National Football League (NFL). He played college football at Wake Forest. He was drafted by the New England Patriots in the sixth round (195th overall) of the 2020 NFL Draft.

Early life and high school career
Herron was in the class of 2014 at Bullis School in Potomac, Maryland, where he played as an offensive lineman. In addition to football, he played baseball and basketball and was a trumpeter in the jazz band. A 3-star recruit, Herron committed to Wake Forest over offers from Boston College, Old Dominion, Rutgers, and Villanova.

College career
Herron tore his ACL in Week 1 of the 2018 season. After coming back for another year as a graduate student, he was named a team captain and earned third-team All-ACC honors. He set the Wake Forest record with 51 games played.

Professional career

New England Patriots
Herron was selected by the New England Patriots in the sixth round, with the 195th overall pick of the 2020 NFL Draft. He was placed on injured reserve on October 31, 2020 with an ankle injury. He was activated on November 28, 2020.

Las Vegas Raiders
On September 21, 2022, the Patriots traded Herron and a 2024 seventh round pick to the Las Vegas Raiders in exchange for a 2024 sixth round pick. He suffered a torn ACL in practice and was placed on injured reserve on October 7, 2022.

Personal life
His father Reggie played basketball at Villanova. His uncle Keith was a second-round selection in the 1978 NBA Draft by the Portland Trail Blazers and played five seasons in the NBA.

On March 22, 2021, Herron and another citizen were given “Outstanding Service” awards by the Tempe, Arizona, Police Department for helping save a woman from a violent sexual assault.

References

External links

Wake Forest bio
Patriots bio

1995 births
Living people
American football offensive guards
American football offensive tackles
New England Patriots players
Las Vegas Raiders players
People from Silver Spring, Maryland
Players of American football from Maryland
Sportspeople from Montgomery County, Maryland
Wake Forest Demon Deacons football players